Glaucocharis subnatalensis is a moth in the family Crambidae. It was described by Stanisław Błeszyński in 1970. It is found in South Africa.

References

Endemic moths of South Africa
Diptychophorini
Moths described in 1970